Erin Martin (born October 14, 1983) is an American pop singer, songwriter, composer and model from Berrien Springs, Michigan. Martin is known as her unique voice and her “Egyptian Warrior Princess” style, headband and her signature hairstyle she calls a “FroHawk”, a portmanteau of “afro” and “mohawk”. Martin was a contestant on the second season of VH1’s “Rock of Love” and the second season of NBC's The Voice as a part of "Team Cee Lo”. Martin is musically influenced by Billie Holiday, India Arie, Björk and Fiona Apple.

Early years 
Martin was born in Berrien Springs, Michigan to a white American father and an African American mother. For about 10 years, Martin’s father was a President of a local playhouse that enabled Martin to be involved in some productions of musical theater. When she wasn’t involved in any theater production, she participated in Renaissance Fair.

At 10 years old, Martin was diagnosed with ulcerative colitis. It is an inflammatory bowel disease that affects the lining of the large intestine and rectum. After 4 years suffered from the disease, Martin had surgery to remove her intestine.

Martin started playing piano when she was 12 which she also writes classical music and new age. Martin only started to play guitar in 2007 when her friend gave her an electric guitar and amp.

Martin described herself as rebel who needs freedom. So, Martin moved to Chicago when she was 17. 
Martin later attended Lake Michigan College.

Modeling career 
Martin started her modeling career when she was 14. She had signed with several modeling agencies such as Aria, Ford Models and "Elite Chicago". As a model, Martin has worked in commercials, print ads and editorial spreads in various magazines. Some of big companies and brand that Martin has worked with before were Kohl’s, Carson Pirie Scott, Pepsi, Crate & Barrel, Noxzema and Whirlpool, to name a few.

Martin also has been featured in several magazines such as "Shore Magazine", "Flor Magazine", Time Out Chicago and Chicago Magazine. Martin also has been involved in several fashion shows in Michigan.

Rock of Love Season 2 
Martin was a cast on the VH1 reality television dating game show, “Rock of Love” that stars Bret Michaels, the lead singer of band Poison. The show was premiered on January 13, 2008.”

In the show, Martin was known as “Lyanna Erin Martin”. However, Martin was eliminated after the first episode. Martin commented on the elimination, “He said I was too innocent and I didn’t fit in with any of the other girls. But he also said my music was more important than the show and being on the show could ruin my career, so he kicked me off.”

The Voice (US) Season 2 

Martin appeared on the second season of NBC The Voice. The show was premiered on February 5, 2012. During Blind Audition, Martin performed "Hey There Delilah" by Plain White T's. Two of 4 judges, Blake Shelton and Cee Lo Green pushed the ‘I Want You’ button and turned around that indicates they wanted her to be on their team. Cee Lo Green commented, "Your voice is so strange and unique and bizarre and great and wonderful. I love it." Blake Shelton commented, "You're what The Voice is. You're that special sound that I personally have never heard before." Martin chose Cee Lo Green as her coach and became one of 12 contestants in “Team Cee Lo”.

For Battle Round, Cee Lo Green paired up Martin with "The Shield Brothers" to sing one of Tina Turner’s hit, “What’s Love Got to Do with It”. The decision made by Cee Lo surprised many people as "The Shield Brothers" are a Rock ‘n’ Roll vocal duo while Martin is known as a folk/pop singer. Adam Levine commented on the battle, “Erin, clearly, a very unique approach.” Adam however went with The Shields Brothers. Christina Aguilera loved the battle, “That was entertainment. That was fun. I had so much fun watching you guys and that’s what Battle Round should really be about.” Christina Aguilera also sided with The Shields Brothers. Blake Shelton commented, "Erin I'm glad you wore that because now that I'm married, girls dressed like that is all I have" and went with Erin.  Cee Lo Green commented, “With Erin, maybe the song was not the one that gave you the opportunity to really shine but I love your voice too. I think it’s so strange. I think in another kind of setting, I can really embellish on it. I love you both and I see things that we can both do but what I feel like have the most prospect with is Erin.” Martin advanced to the live Shows in a hotly contested battle that got her trending worldwide on Twitter.

For Live Shows, Martin performed “Walk Like An Egyptian” by The Bangles. Blake Shelton commented on her performance, “I think you did as good as you could do with that song. I mean, I think, vocally it’s as good as you can be with that song.” Christina Aguilera commented, “I disagree. You can take any song and make it amazing. You do have a very unique and special voice.”  However, Christina Aguilera thought that Martin should have done more. The next day, during the Result Show, Carson Daly announced that Martin is in the bottom 3 alongside Tony Vincent and Cheesa. Martin performed “Your Song” by Sir Elton John for the Last Chance performance to convince Cee Lo Green that he should save her and should not eliminate her. Cee Lo Green chose to save Cheesa. Martin was eliminated from the show on April 11, 2012 - together with Tony Vincent.

Awards and other works

In 2007, Martin was named as one of the 45 musicians for Music 45: Who Rocks Chicago by NewCity.
In 2010, Martin was chosen as one of the 12 women in 12 cities for "Real Weather Girls". Martin represented Chicago. Real Weather Girls is the first mobile (available on iPhone, iPod and iPad) application that offers daily original video content. Buyers will get up-to-the-minute local, national, and international weather updates, radar maps and the seven-day forecast, along with original daily video content which follows the lives of 12 women in 12 different cities around the globe.
In March 2011, Martin was nominated for "50 Most Beautiful Chicagoans" by Chicago Magazine
Martin’s single, "Balloon" was featured on ABC’s TV series, Pretty Little Liars.

Discography
 "I Have a Vision" and "What Cha Gonna Do?"—lead vocalist; tracks from Roy Davis Jr.'s 2009 album God Life Music. "I Have a Vision" was a number 3 hit on the U.K. dance charts.
 Balloon (Single) (July 2011)
 Firestarter (Single) (Sept 2011)
 Kinder Than Silence (EP) (Sept 2011)
 Marianne (EP) (Sept 2011)

Filmography

See also
 List of people diagnosed with ulcerative colitis

References

External links

What Goes Around Short Film by Shawn Montgemory
Erin Martin Interview by Screen Team Media
Erin Martin The Voice Backstage Interview by TVWoodNews

1983 births
Living people
21st-century American women guitarists
21st-century American guitarists
21st-century American women singers
20th-century African-American women singers
African-American women singer-songwriters
American female models
American women pop singers
American women singer-songwriters
American indie pop musicians
American people of Dutch Antillean descent
People from Berrien Springs, Michigan
The Voice (franchise) contestants
21st-century American singers
African-American guitarists
21st-century African-American women singers
Singer-songwriters from Michigan